Bansulab-e Shirzad (also Romanized as Bānsūlāb-e Shīrzād; also known as Bān Sūleh-ye Shīrzād and Kotak Bozorg) is a village in Qalkhani Rural District, Gahvareh District, Dalahu County, Kermanshah Province, Iran. At the 2006 census, its population was 27, in 8 families.

References 

Populated places in Dalahu County